Shelley Lynn Anna is an American chemical engineer and experimental fluid dynamics researcher who studies droplets, multiphase flow, and the effects of surfactants in microfluidics, the rheology of extensional and interfacial flows, and microscale transport. She is a professor of chemical engineering and associate dean for faculty and graduate affairs and strategic initiatives in the Carnegie Mellon University College of Engineering.

Education and career
Anna majored in physics at Carnegie Mellon University, graduating in 1995. She went to Harvard University for graduate study in engineering sciences, earned a master's degree there in 1996, and completed her Ph.D. in 2000.

After a year in industry working for Solutia, and postdoctoral research at Harvard University, she returned to Carnegie Mellon University as an assistant professor of mechanical engineering in 2003. She moved to the department of chemical engineering in 2008, and was promoted to associate professor in 2009 and full professor in 2013.

Anna is also a cello player, and has used cello demonstrations as an example in her work as an engineering educator.

Recognition
Anna was named a Fellow of the American Physical Society (APS) in 2014, after a nomination from the APS Division of Fluid Dynamics, "for contributions in extensional rheology and droplet microfluidics and in particular for elucidating and manipulating the effect of surfactants in microfluidic tip streaming".

References

External links
Home page

Year of birth missing (living people)
Living people
American chemical engineers
American women engineers
Fluid dynamicists
Carnegie Mellon University alumni
Harvard University alumni
Carnegie Mellon University faculty
Fellows of the American Physical Society